Tutti frutti (Italian for "all fruits") may refer to:

Food and drink
Tutti frutti, a confection (often ice cream) containing a variety of chopped fruits and/or flavors
Tutti Frutti Frozen Yogurt, a California-based frozen yogurt outlet

Music
"Tutti Frutti", a 1938 novelty jazz hit sung by Slim & Slam
"Tutti Frutti" (song), a 1955 hit song by Little Richard
"Tutti Frutti" (New Order song), a 2015 song by New Order
Tutti Frutti (Brazilian band), a Brazilian rock band that accompanied Rita Lee in the 1970s, after she left Os Mutantes
Tutti Frutti (Croatian band), a Yugoslavian band

Theatre, film and television
Tutti Frutti (1987 TV series), 1987 drama about a Scottish band
Tutti Frutti (1990 TV series), a German television game show on RTL from 1990–1993
Miss Tutti Frutti, a 1921 film directed by Michael Curtiz

Literature
Tutti frutti; aus den Papieren des Verstorbenen, work by Hermann, Fürst von Pückler-Muskau